Momčilo Rudan (born January 9, 1990) is a Serbian footballer who plays as a defender.

Playing career
Rudan began playing in 2008 in the Serbian League Belgrade with FK Šumadija Jagnjilo, and with FK Palilulac Beograd in 2009. He had a loan spell with FK Sloboda Užice in 2009, and had stints with OFK Bačka, FK Voždovac, FK Jedinstvo Ub, and FK Sopot. He later played in the Serbian Zone League, and Serbian League Vojvodina with FK Senta, and FK Đerdap. In 2014, he played abroad in the Macedonian First Football League with FK Sileks. After two seasons abroad he played in the Serbian First League with former club FK Sloboda Užice.

In 2017, he returned to the Serbian League Vojvodina with FK Bratstvo Prigrevica. In 2018, he made his second stint abroad in the Canadian Soccer League with Scarborough SC. In his debut season he assisted Scarborough in reaching the CSL Championship final, but were defeated by FC Vorkuta in a penalty shootout.

References

1990 births
Living people
Association football defenders
Serbian footballers
FK Sileks players
FK Sloboda Užice players
Scarborough SC players
Macedonian First Football League players
Serbian First League players
Canadian Soccer League (1998–present) players
FK Palilulac Beograd players
FK Voždovac players
FK Jedinstvo Ub players
FK Senta players
OFK Bačka players
Serbian League players